Centre Street is a street in the Sai Ying Pun area of Hong Kong. Centre Street is the central point of the most active traditional market in Western District of Hong Kong Island. The street is part of planned streets in the early development of the area.

Location
Centre Street runs north to south from Connaught Road, crossing Des Voeux Road West and Queen's Road West then climbing steeply up the hill crossing First Street, Second Street, Third Street, High Street then via a long escalator to Bonham Road. Western Street and Eastern Street run parallel north to south steeply. The top part of the street has a slope of 1:4. It is used by approximately 10,000 pedestrians per day.

Facilities
From north to south:
 Centre Street Market, between First Street and Second Street
 Sai Ying Pun Market, between Second Street and Third Street
 A small park with seats is located between Second Street and Third Street
 Centre Street Escalator Link, between Third Street and Bonham Road

Side lanes
Lanes off Centre Street include Ying Wa Terrace, Cheung On Lane, Yu Lok Lane, and David Lane (containing the Yu Kwan Yick chili sauce factory). These lanes are only accessible to pedestrians, and contain stairs.

Transport
Traffic conditions vary with the area between High Street and Second Street blocked to vehicles. The uppermost part is two-way traffic to the stairs, and the lowermost part is one-way to Connaught Road West where vehicles can turn left or right.

Green Mini Bus 12 has a terminus on the lower part of the street, and bus route 5S has a morning run starting from the lower part.

A series of escalators run uphill in the Centre Street Market and the Sai Ying Pun Market buildings, taking pedestrians from First to Third Street. The Centre Street Escalator Link then takes pedestrians all the way to the top of the street to Bonham Road. Construction of the escalator cost $60,000,000 HKD.

Sai Ying Pun station opened on 29 March 2015, with a station entrance just behind the Centre Street Market.

Constituency
An electoral constituency in the Central and Western District Council is named after Centre Street, Centre Street Constituency.
The boundaries of this electorate follow Eastern Street, Queen's Road West, Eastern Street, High Street, and Bonham Road. 
The polling station was located in the Kau Yan Church and school in High Street.
On 11 June 2006, a by-election elected Lee Chi Hang (李志恆), Sidney. The boundaries for the 2007 election will be extended to add on a block bounded by Des Voeux Road west, Centre Street, and Eastern Street. In 2006, the constituency had 6168 registered voters.

See also
Central–Mid-Levels escalator
List of streets and roads in Hong Kong
 Transport in Hong Kong

References

Hong Kong City Guide 2003,

External links
 

Sai Ying Pun
Roads on Hong Kong Island